Pauline Croze (born 4 May 1979, in Noisy-le-Sec) is a French pop/folk singer and musician.

She started to sing and play the guitar when she was fourteen and six years later she made her first demos with Quito of the group Señor Holmes. At this time she made her very first appearance on stage.

In 2003, she collaborated with Anne Claverie and Édith Fambuena of the Valentins in Transmusicales de Rennes, a work for which she is very well known.

She played as the support of Miossec, -M-, Bernard Lavilliers, Cali, Tryo or Lhasa.

In 2011, she collaborated with fellow French musician, Ben Mazué on his single, C'est léger, from his debut album.

Her first album Pauline Croze was released in February 2005, followed by Un bruit qui court in 2007. Her third album, Le prix de l'Eden was released on 22 October 2012. She released Bossa nova in 2016.

Discography

Studio albums

References

External links 
 Official Facebook Page 
 Official YouTube Channel 

1979 births
Living people
French folk-pop singers
21st-century French singers
21st-century French women singers